Landscape with the Burial of St. Serapia is a 1639–40 oil-on-canvas painting by the French artist Claude Lorrain, one of several commissioned from the artist by Philip IV of Spain and now in the Prado Museum. it shows the burial of Saint Serapia, slave to Saint Sabina – the lid of the sarcophagus is shown with the inscription SEPVLTVRA.S.SABIN (a)... SEPELIR(e) IVBET.C.SANCTAE SERAPI(ae). Her martyrdom occurred in Vindena, now known to have been sited near Terni, although at the time the painting was produced it was thought to be located on the Aventine Hill (hence the Basilica of Santa Sabina).

Landscape paintings
1640 paintings
Paintings by Claude Lorrain
Paintings of the Museo del Prado by French artists